Kochakkan Chacko Abraham (20 January 1899 in Cochin, Kerala – 14 March 1986) was the Governor of Andhra Pradesh between 15 August 1978 – 15 August 1983. He belonged to the Indian National Congress.

Early life
He was born in Cochin, Kerala on 20 January 1899. He has a bachelor's degree and worked for 30 years as a teacher, also as a headmaster.

Career
He was a Member of Travancore Cochin Legislative Assembly (1954–56). He was the 1st and 2nd KLA Legislator from Njarakkal-Congress.
 He entered active politics quite late after he retired as a school headmaster. He was a member of the Congress working committee (CWC) at the time of the great split in 1969. With the 21 member committee split into 10 Pro- syndicate and 10 Pro- Indira group, it was KC Abraham who played a mediator role to bring the two groups together though he was very much pro- Syndicate. Finally he stood by his Pro- Syndicate conviction which resulted in the expulsion of Indira Gandhi from the Indian National Congress.

Personal life
He was married to Elizabeth and had a son.

References

1899 births
1986 deaths
Governors of Andhra Pradesh
Indian National Congress politicians from Kerala
Travancore–Cochin MLAs 1954–1956
Politicians from Kochi
Kerala MLAs 1957–1959
Kerala MLAs 1960–1964
Indian National Congress politicians from Andhra Pradesh